Killa Fonic (born February 14, 1989) is a Romanian singer and songwriter, former member of the band Șatra B.E.N.Z. The artist began a solo career and, in 2016, released his first album, Ramses 1989.

Life and career
Killa Fonic was born on February 14, 1989, in the city of Ploiești. The artist grew up in a local community in the yard of a military unit. His passion for hip hop music was instilled in him by his father, who brought him tapes and made him listen only to quality music.

In 2013, Killa Fonic released his first tracks, "Sit back and smoke", "Sesiune pe vinil", "Drink & Blunt", and "24", which he posted on his YouTube channel. Also, in the same year, his first mixtape, Lord de cartier, appeared.

In 2015 he became one of the founding members of the band Șatra B.E.N.Z., with whom he released two albums: O.$.O.D. (O șatră, o dragoste) and O.$.O.D. II.

His first solo album is called Ramses 1989, was released in 2016 and was promoted by several songs, including a collaboration with Irina Rimes for the single "Baby Blues".

Just one year after his solo debut, Killa Fonic released his second album, Lamă Crimă, in July 2017. This album contains 23 tracks and collaborations with Irina Rimes, Connect-R, Shift, Nane, Pacha Man, Nosfe, Super ED, O.G. EastBull, Domnul Udo and Jakoban.

In December 2018, the singer released his first EP, Emotiv Munteana, which contains seven stories about seven earthly women.
In the spring of 2019, the artist chose to leave the band Șatra B.E.N.Z., created his label called KHK (Killa House Klan) and signed with Global Records.

On September 12, 2019, Killa Fonic released the single "Bambolina", a collaboration with Carla's Dreams. The song is composed by Killa Fonic and Carla's Dreams, and the producers are Alex Cotoi and Mihai Alexandru Bogdan. "Bambolina" climbed to 1st place in the Top Airplay 100 41 days after its launch and remained in the Top 10 for another 13 weeks.

In early 2020, Killa Fonic composed and performed the song from the soundtrack of the movie "Miami Bici". The single peaked in 3rd place in the Top Airplay 100 and remained in the Top 10 for another three weeks.

On June 1, 2020, the artist released III, the first album of that year. At the end of 2020, the BeetleJuice album, inspired by Tim Burton's movie, was released. This album contains 11 tracks and collaborations with Spike and 911.

On February 12, 2021, Killa Fonic and Smiley released the single "Lasă inima să zbiere", the first collaboration between the two artists. At the end of spring, the album 2089 was released, a fusion LP between techno and pop music. Terra Vista, Killa Fonic's second album in 2021, was released on December 17.

Discography

Albums

Studio albums

Extended plays

Mixtapes

Singles

As lead artist

As featured artist

Filmography

References

External links 

 
 

1989 births
People from Ploiești
21st-century Romanian singers
Global Records artists
English-language singers from Romania
Living people
21st-century Romanian male singers